The Court of Neptune Fountain is a group of bronze sculptures made by Roland Hinton Perry in 1897–98. Jerome Connor may have assisted in their manufacture.

The sculptures are located at the Library of Congress, at Independence Avenue and 1st St S.E. Washington, D.C. The god Neptune is flanked by figures of the Tritons, each blowing a conch shell.

See also

 History of fountains in the United States
 List of public art in Washington, D.C., Ward 6

References

External links
 

1897 establishments in the United States
1898 sculptures
Bronze sculptures in Washington, D.C.
Dolphins in art
Fountains in Washington, D.C.
Horses in art
Monuments and memorials in Washington, D.C.
Nude sculptures in Washington, D.C.
Outdoor sculptures in Washington, D.C.
Sculptures by Roland Hinton Perry
Sculptures of Neptune
Seashells in art
Capitol Hill